Mannopeptimycin glycopeptide is a lead antibiotic peptide.

References

Antibiotics